Udea constricta is a moth of the family Crambidae. It is endemic to the Hawaiian islands of Kauai, Oahu and Molokai.

The larvae feed on Scaevola species, including Scaevola chamisoniana, Scaevola gaudichaudii and Scaevola tnollis.

External links

Moths described in 1882
Endemic moths of Hawaii
constricta